The Somaliland University of Technology (SUTECH) is a tertiary academic institution located in Hargeisa, Woqooyi Galbeed, Somaliland.

Overview
The university was founded in 2000 as a small non-profit educational institution by Dr. Saeed Sheikh Mohamed. It was formerly known as the Hargeisa College of Applied Arts & Technology (CAAT). The CAAT was an approved center of City & Guilds and Edexcel.

The Somaliland University of Technology is situated in a campus of 20 hectares donated by Dr. Mohamed. Building construction was funded by the Islamic Development Bank based in Jeddah, Saudi Arabia and opened in 2007.

The university has two partnership agreements with the University of Khartoum and Ahfad University for women in Sudan.

The Somaliland University of Technology signed an agreements of cooperation with three African universities. The four universities agreed to work together as full partners within the framework of Intra-ACP Academic EU Funded Program. The main objective of the program is to develop and/or enhance the graduate studies programs of each university (Master's degree and PhD), and to exchange staff, faculties, and students.

Faculties and institutes
The university consists of the following faculties and institutes:
 Faculty of Engineering and Architecture
 Institute of Global Studies
 Faculty of ICT & Computer Sciences
 Faculty of Economics and Business Administration
 Faculty of Allied Sciences
 Faculty of Natural Sciences
 Faculty of Environment Studies
 Faculty of Social Sciences 
 Hargeisa College of Vocational Training & Alternative Studies:
 Accounting Technician Program
 Office Management
 Computer Skills
 Agriculture Extension
 Women Empowerment

There are two independent centers which work closely with different faculties:
School of Foreign Languages
High school diploma program

References

External links
Somaliland University of Technology homepage 
Somaliland Government website - see External Links CAAT College

Private universities and colleges
Universities in Somalia
Organisations based in Hargeisa
Technical universities and colleges
Educational institutions established in 2000
2000 establishments in Somalia